Mein Kampf, Adolf Hitler's 900-page autobiography outlining his political views, has been translated into Arabic a number of times since the early 1930s.

Translations

Translations between 1934 and 1937
The first attempts to translate Mein Kampf into Arabic were extracts in various Arab newspapers in the early 1930s. Journalist and Arab nationalist Yunus al-Sabawi published translated extracts in the Baghdad newspaper al-Alam al-Arabi, alarming the Baghdadi Jewish community. Lebanese newspaper Al Nida also separately published extractions in 1934. The German consulate denied it had been in touch with Al Nida for these initial translations.

Whether a translation published by the Nazi regime would be allowed, ultimately depended on Hitler. Fritz Grobba, the German ambassador to the Kingdom of Iraq, played a key role in urging the translation. The largest issue was the book's racism. Grobba suggested modifying the text "in ways that correspond to the sensitivities of the race conscious Arabs", such as changing "anti-Semitic" to "anti-Jewish", "bastardized" to "dark" and toning down arguments for the supremacy of the "Aryan race".

Hitler wanted to avoid allowing any modifications, but accepted the Arabic book changes after two years. Grobba sent 117 clippings from al-Sabawi's translations, but Bernhard Moritz, an Arabist consultant for the German Government who was also fluent in Arabic, said the proposed translation was incomprehensible and rejected it. This particular attempt ended at that time.

Subsequently, the Ministry of Propaganda of Germany decided to proceed with the translation via the German bookshop Overhamm in Cairo. The translator was Ahmad Mahmud al-Sadati, a Muslim and the publisher of one of the first Arabic books on National Socialism: Adolf Hitler, za'im al-ishtirakiya al-waṭaniya ma' al-bayan lil-mas'ala al-yahudiya. "(Adolf Hitler, leader of National Socialism, together with an explanation of the Jewish question)." The manuscript was presented for Dr. Moritz's review in 1937. Once again, he rejected the translation, saying it was incomprehensible.

1937 translation
Al-Sadati published his translation of Mein Kampf in Cairo in 1937 without German approval. According to Yekutiel Gershoni and James Jankowski, the Sadati translation did not receive wide circulation. However, the local Arab weekly Rose al-Yūsuf then used passages from an original 1930 German version to infer that Hitler deemed the Egyptians a "decadent people composed of cripples." The review raised angry responses. Hamid Maliji, an Egyptian attorney wrote:

Another commentator, Niqula Yusuf, denounced the militant nationalism of Mein Kampf as "chauvinist".

The Egyptian journal al-Isala stated that "it was Hitler's tirades in Mein Kampf that turned anti-Semitism into a political doctrine and a program for action". al-Isala rejected Nazism in many publications.

Attempts at revision
A German diplomat in Cairo suggested that instead of deleting the offending passage about Arabs, it would be better to add to the introduction a statement that "Egyptian people" were differentially developed and that the Egyptians standing at a higher level themselves do not want to be placed on the same level with their numerous backward fellow Egyptians.'" Otto von Hentig, a staff member of the German foreign ministry suggested that the translation should be rewritten in a style "that every Muslim understands: the Koran," to give it a more sacred tone. He said that "a truly good Arabic translation would meet with extensive sympathy in the whole Arabic speaking world from Morocco to India." Eventually the translation was sent to Arab nationalism advocate Shakib Arslan. Arslan, who lived in Geneva, Switzerland, was an editor of La Nation arabe, an influential Arab nationalist paper. He also was a confidant of Haj Amin al-Husseini, a Palestinian Arab nationalist and Muslim leader in the British Mandate of Palestine, who met with Hitler.

Arslan's 960-page translation was almost completed when the Germans requested to calculate the cost of the first 10,000 copies to be printed with "the title and back of the flexible cloth binding... lettered in gold." On 21 December 1938 the project was rejected by the German Ministry of Propaganda because of the high cost of the projected publication.

1963 translation
A new translation was published in 1963, translated by Luis al-Haj. Some authors claim that al-Hajj was a Nazi war criminal originally named Luis Heiden who fled to Egypt after World War II. However, Arabic sources and more recent publications identify him as Louis al-Hajj (لويس الْحاج), a translator and writer from Lebanon, who later became the editor in chief of the newspaper al-Nahar (النَّهار) in Beirut, and who translated parts of Mein Kampf from French into Arabic in 1963. Al-Hajj’s translation contains only fragments of Hitler’s 800-page book.

1995 edition
The book was republished in 1995 by Bisan Publishers in Beirut.

As of 2002, news dealers on Edgware Road in central London, an area with a large Arab population, were selling the translation. In 2005, the Intelligence and Terrorism Information Center, an Israeli think tank, confirmed the continued sale of the Bisan edition in bookstores in Edgware Road. In 2007 an Agence France-Presse reporter interviewed a bookseller at the Cairo International Book Fair who stated he had sold many copies of Mein Kampf.

Role in Nazi propaganda
One of the leaders of the Syrian Ba'ath Party, Sami al-Jundi, wrote: "We were racialists, admiring Nazism, reading its books and the source of its thought... We were the first to think of translating Mein Kampf."

According to Jeffrey Herf, "To be sure, the translations of Hitler's Mein Kampf and The Protocols of the Elders of Zion into Arabic were important sources of the diffusion of Nazi ideology and anti-Semitic conspiracy thinking to Arab and Muslim intellectuals. Although both texts were available in various Arabic editions before the war began, they played little role in the Third Reich's Arab propaganda."

Mein Kampf and Arab nationalism
Mein Kampf has been pointed to as an example of the influence of Nazism for Arab nationalists. According to Stefan Wild of the University of Bonn, Hitler's philosophy of National Socialism – of a state headed by a single, strong, charismatic leader with a submissive and adoring people – was a model for the founders of the Arab nationalist movement. Arabs favored Germany over other European powers, because "Germany was seen as having no direct colonial or territorial ambitions in the area. This was an important point of sympathy", Wild wrote. They also saw German nationhood—which preceded German statehood—as a model for their own movement.

In October 1938, anti-Jewish treatises that included extracts from Mein Kampf were disseminated at an Islamic parliamentarians' conference "for the defense of Palestine" in Cairo.

During the Suez war
In a speech to the United Nations immediately following the Suez Crisis in 1956, Israeli Foreign Minister Golda Meir claimed that the Arabic translation of Mein Kampf was found in Egyptian soldiers' knapsacks. In the same speech she also described Gamal Abdel Nasser as a "disciple of Hitler who was determined to annihilate Israel". After the war, David Ben-Gurion likened Nasser's Philosophy of the Revolution to Hitler's Mein Kampf, a comparison also made by French Prime Minister Guy Mollet, though Time Magazine at the time discounted this comparison as "overreaching". "Seen from Washington and New York, Nasser was not Hitler and Suez was not the Sinai," writes Philip Daniel Smith, dismissing the comparison. According to Benny Morris, however, Nasser had not publicly called for the destruction of Israel until after the war, but other Egyptian politicians preceded him in this regard. The second generation of Israeli history textbooks included a photograph of Hitler's Mein Kampf found at Egyptian posts during the war. Elie Podeh writes that the depiction is "probably genuine", but that it "served to dehumanize Egypt (and especially Nasser) by associating it with the Nazis."

References

See also
Antisemitism in Islam
Antisemitism in the Arab world
Contemporary imprints of The Protocols of the Elders of Zion
History of the Jews under Muslim rule
Relations between Nazi Germany and the Arab world
Mein Kampf in English
Persecution of Jews in the Muslim world

Antisemitism in the Arab world
Mein Kampf
Translations into Arabic